Duffields is a passenger rail station on MARC Train's Brunswick Line, in the community of Duffields, West Virginia. Since it is located in West Virginia, the station is maintained by the West Virginia State Rail Authority rather than by MARC itself. Between  and  this station was served by Amtrak's Shenandoah which traveled between Washington and Cincinnati.

In 2015, a study began to look into the feasibility of replacing the station with a new station in nearby Ranson, West Virginia.

Station layout
The station is not compliant with the Americans with Disabilities Act of 1990.

References

External links

 Duffields station official website
 Station from Flowing Springs Road from Google Map Street View

Brunswick Line
Buildings and structures in Jefferson County, West Virginia
Railway stations in West Virginia
MARC Train stations
Transportation in Jefferson County, West Virginia